Caslon usually refers to William Caslon (I) of United Kingdom (1692–1766), who was an English gunsmith and designer of typographic fonts. 

Caslon may also refer to:
 Lucy Caslon, (since April 2014 Lucy Herron) the founding trustee of the London-based charity Msizi Africa.
 Caslon Type Foundry
 Caslon, a family of typeface, created by William Caslon. 
 Caslon Antique, a decorative American typeface that was designed in 1894 by Berne Nadall.
 Caslon Roman, a Unicode typeface, designed by George Williams.
 Elizabeth Caslon (I) a typographer who died in 1795
 Elizabeth Caslon (died 1833) (II) a typographer, daughter in law of Elizabeth Caslon (I) who died in 1833

See also 

Carlon